"Why I'm Here" is a song by American hard rock band Oleander. It was released the lead single from their major label debut album, February Son, in January 1999. The track was previously included on Oleander's eponymous EP in 1996 and their independent LP, Shrinking the Blob, in 1997. Despite comparisons to Nirvana's "Heart-Shaped Box," or perhaps because of them, "Why I'm Here" would become Oleander's highest-charting song in the United States. The promotional CD single of "Why I'm Here" includes both the album version and a "No Strings Attached" version that omits the violin.

Composition

The melancholy power ballad features various hallmarks of post-grunge. A simple, clean guitar pattern strikingly similar to "Heart-Shaped Box" begins the song; the first three notes, as well as the dynamic contour, of both songs are indeed identical and largely responsible for its criticism. An additional guitar melody and drums enter shortly after with lonesome singing. The pre-chorus introduces a bittersweet violin and eventually enters an aggressive, heavy chorus. Lyrically, "Why I'm Here" describes people's vague resentment toward the narrator as well his/her indifference toward a significant other, singing "I can't love you anymore/I'm scared of the sound of it."

Reception
AllMusic's Heather Phares named "Why I'm Here" one of three AMG Album Picks in her review of February Son. She regarded it as among the band's "finest post-grunge-isms." However, Noel Murray of The A.V. Club viewed the song more negatively, regarded Oleander as "[arriving] too late for grunge and too early for emo." He elaborated that "the band gamely struggles to justify its existence to major-label masters who can hear something marketable, but can't figure out who'd want to buy it."

Track listing

Charts

Weekly charts

Year-end charts

References

1990s ballads
1996 songs
1999 singles
Oleander (band) songs
Rock ballads
Universal Records singles